Jerroll D. Olson (born 1933) is a former American football coach. He served as the head football coach at the University of North Dakota  from 1968 to 1977, compiling a record of 54–39–4.  Olson was born in 1933, on farm in Walsh County, North Dakota.  He graduated from high school in Hoople, North Dakota before attending Valley City State University, where he lettered in football, basketball, and baseball.

Head coaching record

College

References

1933 births
Living people
American football tackles
American men's basketball players
North Dakota Fighting Hawks football coaches
Valley City State Vikings baseball players
Valley City State Vikings football players
Valley City State Vikings men's basketball players
High school football coaches in Minnesota
People from Walsh County, North Dakota
Players of American football from North Dakota
Baseball players from North Dakota
Basketball players from North Dakota